Hildegardia populifolia is a species of flowering plant in the family Malvaceae. It is found only in the Eastern Ghats of Andhra Pradesh and Tamil Nadu in India. It is threatened by habitat loss; just about 20 trees are known to exist on the eastern slopes of the Kalrayan Hills.

This is a deciduous tree growing up to 20 meters tall. It has lobed leaves and panicles of flowers with red sepals and no petals. Most trees produce both male and bisexual flowers.

The bee Trigona iridipennis feeds on the pollen and nectar. The flowers are visited by several bird species, such as the red-vented bulbul (Pycnonotus cafer), rufous-backed shrike (Lanius schach), blue-tailed bee-eater (Merops philippinus), and stork-billed kingfisher (Pelargopsis capensis), some of which are predators of the bee.

References

Sterculioideae
Endemic flora of India (region)
Critically endangered plants
Taxonomy articles created by Polbot